ELISAVA is the first school of design, an internationally oriented educational and research institution affiliated with Pompeu Fabra University   The school is situated in Barcelona and is home to around 2,200 students and more than 800 teachers.

ELISAVA has been merged with Pompeu Fabra University since 1995. In 2000, ELISAVA won a National Innovation and Design Award. In 2013, the magazine Domus ranked it among the top design and architecture schools in Europe.

History

Origins 
Founded in Barcelona in 1961, ELISAVA was launched to create a new venue for teaching design, as part of the CIC's Cultural Institution Foundation. The school gradually came to   oriented itself    theoretical and practical training  when tackling and resolving design problems, as opposed to repeating problems that have already been solved (as in artisan education). In 1997 the school added a programme in Industrial Design Engineering, and in 1998 it launched its Architecture programme.

1991, Master’s and postgraduate programmes 
ELISAVA's postgraduate workshops got underway in 1990 with the aid of such outstanding designers as Francesco Binfarré, Achile Castiglioni, Isao Hosoe, Santiago Miranda, Jonathan de Pas and Denis Santachiara.  The postgraduate workshops continued until they became postgraduate and Master's programmes in academic year 1991-1992 as part of the cooperation agreement that ELISAVA signed with the University of Barcelona. Through ELISAVA's affiliation with the Pompeu Fabra University (UPF), today, it offers around 20 Master's and 40 postgraduate programmes related professional practice in all areas of design and engineering in conjunction with the UPF's IDEC (Institute of Continuing Education).

2003, Private Foundation ELISAVA University School 
To promote the school and making it more autonomous, in 2003 the CIC's Cultural Foundation set up the private foundation,  ELISAVA University School. Its original mission was:  to promote education, knowledge, research, development, innovation and the use of new technologies in the fields of science, technology, business and the arts; to boost and consolidate the quality of the degree programmes and services offered; to increase the range of continuing education programmes and to enhance student job placement; to adapt the range of programmes and services to the needs of an ever-changing society and business world; to attain international outreach; to contribute to the social, cultural and economic progress of society; and to foster the personal development of the members of the ELISAVA community.

2009, integration into the new European university framework 
In 2009, ELISAVA's educational programme became fully integrated into the European Higher Education Area by offering its bachelor's degree in design, its bachelor's degree in Industrial Design Engineering and its bachelor's degree in Building Engineering for the first time. Prior to that, it had been offering a University Master's in Communication and Design since 2008.

Previous campus locations 
ELISAVA's current modern campus was preceded by various locations due to its rising popularity and steady growth in the number of students and instructors. The actual campus has excellent study and research facilities, special tools for modeling, workspace for students, lecture facilities, conference rooms, and spacious exhibition facilities.

Fields of knowledge 
ELISAVA offers educational programmes in:
Graphic Design and Communication
Product Design
Industrial Engineering Design
Interior Space Design
Architecture
Fashion
Design Strategy

Network of international relations 
ELISAVA has agreements with more than 60 universities in Europe, the United States, Latin America, Asia and Australia. It is a member of the Cumulus network, which brings together more than 100 renowned institutions from all over the world to promote international cooperation. It is also a member of the International Association for Exchange of Students for Technical Experience (IAESTE). It works with the Council on International Educational Exchange, a non-profit organisation designed by the U.S. State Department with the mission of managing international student exchange programmes. It also participates in the LifelongLearning/Erasmus programme promoted by the European Union to bring students closer to Europe and Europe closer to students.

Innovation and business

Relations with businesses 
ELISAVA is a university that is interested in generating and transferring knowledge to companies, forging direct links with the business world and generating real-life learning situations for its students. To date, it has conducted projects and reached agreements with companies and institutions like 3M, Adobe Systems Incorporated, Apple Inc, BMW, Decathlon, Desigual, DuPont, Ericsson, Fabrica (Benetton), Generalitat de Catalunya, Grupo Agbar, Henkel, Hewlett-Packard, Hospital Clínic de Barcelona, Iguzzini, IKEA, LABCO, ICFO, La Caixa, Lego, Mango, Philips, Roca Sanitarios, Sony, Vueling Airlines Fundació Vila Casas, Happy Pills and Smart Design.

Applied research 
ELISAVA conducts research projects applied to design and engineering with the goal of pursuing innovation in business. The research is organised into three main strands: social innovation, innovation in new materials and new manufacturing technologies, and innovation in business. It conducts projects in the fields of visual communication, product design and engineering, mobility and transports, retail space, new materials, sustainability and healthcare. It has worked with the Pasqual Maragall Foundation, ASCER, ALSTOM/ FGC, Rucker-Lypsa, Bayer Material Science and Fabrica.

Temes de Disseny magazine 
Since 1986, ELISAVA has published the magazine ELISAVA Temes de Disseny, a trilingual scholarly research publication which debates issues related to design and its relationship with technology, communication, culture and the economy. https://web.archive.org/web/20131023025710/http://tdd.elisava.net/

Alumni 
The ELISAVA Alumni Association was founded in 2003 as Elisava Professionals (EP). It is a non-profit organisation resulting from the commitment and effort of a group of students and alumni who wished to disseminate and promote the identity and values of the individuals who make up the ELISAVA community.
In 2012, the association embarked upon a new stage to match its new name, Elisava Alumni, and it organised a competition to design its new corporate image. The winning submission, designed by the alumnus Albert Ibanyez, was awarded three Laus prizes organised Foment de les Arts i el Disseny in the categories of Graphic Design-Naming (silver), Entities (silver)  and Graphic Design-Logo (bronze).
The corporate image of Elisava Alumni harks back to the 12th century banner of Saint Otto, which contains one of the first female signatures in Catalan: “Elisava me fecit” (Elisava made me). Spanish-German popstar Álvaro Soler is an alumni at ELISAVA, he studied Design Engineering from 2009 to 2013.

Activities 
ELISAVA promotes and disseminates knowledge related to design and engineering through a busy schedule of activities. In 1991, it began to organise and host a variety of activities as part of Primavera del Disseny, a biannual design fair consisting of a theoretical reflection on the different issues being posed in the world of design.

ELISAVA has hosted a number of conferences related to the different fields of knowledge taught at the school. In 2012, it hosted the European EPIC, Ethnographic Praxis in Industry Conference, on ethnographic research in industry. In 2013, it hosted the first edition of Entretipos, a series of workshops and lectures on typography; the international web design conference WebVisions; and the fourth edition of Algomad, the seminar on generative methods in architecture and design.

ELISAVA regularly welcomes international lecturers and leading professionals from different fields, such as Zaha Hadid, Philippe Starck, Andrea Branzi, Ronan Bouroullec, Xavier Mariscal, or Lidewij Edelkoort.

References

External links 
 

Education in Barcelona